Denis Edward Peter Paul Keefe CMG (born 29 June 1958) is a British diplomat and former Ambassador to Serbia.

Biography
Keefe was educated at Campion School, Hornchurch and studied Classics at Churchill College, Cambridge and Hellenistic Greek poetry at Hertford College, Oxford. He joined the Diplomatic Service in 1982 and served at Nairobi and twice at Prague as well as at the Foreign and Commonwealth Office (FCO) in London. In 2007 he studied Georgian and Russian at Malmö University in preparation for his appointment as ambassador.

Keefe was Ambassador to Georgia 2007–10 including the Russo-Georgian war in 2008. He was one of the victims of the 2010 Georgian news report hoax.

Keefe was Minister and Deputy Head of Mission in Moscow 2010–14. During this time, Russian media harassed him and accused him of being a MI6 officer, possibly because of his supposed actions in Georgia.

Keefe was appointed Ambassador to Serbia from June 2014. In 2019 he was succeeded in the role by Sian MacLeod. He was appointed Companion of the Order of St Michael and St George (CMG) in the 2016 New Year Honours.

References
KEEFE, Denis Edward Peter Paul, Who's Who 2014, A & C Black, 2014; online edn, Oxford University Press, Dec 2013
Mr Denis Keefe Authorised Biography, Debrett's People of Today

1958 births
Living people
Alumni of Churchill College, Cambridge
Alumni of Hertford College, Oxford
Members of HM Diplomatic Service
Ambassadors of the United Kingdom to Georgia (country)
Ambassadors of the United Kingdom to Serbia
Companions of the Order of St Michael and St George
20th-century British diplomats
21st-century British diplomats